Flying Sikh is the nickname of:

 Milkha Singh, a Sikh athlete who represented India in the 1960 and 1964 Summer Olympics
 Joginder Singh (rally driver), a successful endurance rally driver in the 1960s and 1970s
 Karamjit Singh, a Malaysian professional rally driver